Ciothruaidh Ó hEodhasa (died 1518) was an Irish poet. Ó hEodhasa was a member of a Brehon family of County Fermanagh. Under the year 1518, the Annals of the Four Masters record his death:

 O'Hosey (Ciothruaidh, the son of Athairne), a learned poet, who kept a house of general hospitality, died.

See also

 Aengus Ó hEodhasa, poet, died 1480.
 Mealsechlainn Ó hEodhasa, died 1504.
 Giolla Brighde Ó hEoghusa, poet, 1608–1614.
 Gemma Hussey, Fine Gael TD and Minister, 1977–1989.

References

External links
 http://www.ucc.ie/celt/published/T100005D/
 http://www.irishtimes.com/ancestor/surname/index.cfm?fuseaction=Go.&UserID=

Medieval Irish poets
People from County Fermanagh
16th-century Irish writers
16th-century Irish poets
Irish male poets